Thandri Kodukula Challenge is an Indian Telugu film released on 14 January 1987 starring Krishna, Radha, Sumalatha and Kaikala Satyanarayana in the main roles with a musical score by K. Chakravarthy. The film directed by M. Mallikarjuna Rao was produced by M. V. Rama Rao and A. Ramdas for Vijaya Padmalaya Pictures.

With its release coinciding with the Sankranti festival, the film turned out to be a Superhit at the box office despite facing competition from other releases — Majnu, Bhargava Ramudu and Punnami Chandrudu. The film is a remake of the Tamil film Needhikkuppin Paasam.

Synopsis 
Adv. Raja, the younger son of S. P. Chakradhara Rao and Dr. Saraswati Devi, happens to save Shankarayya from the goons of a wicked Veera Swamy and later defends him in the court when he is wrongly framed of attempting to murder Veera Swamy thereby facing his own brother, Ramu in the court and eventually emerging victorious. He later falls in love with Gowri, Shankarayya's daughter much to his mother's chagrin as he was expected to marry Kalyani. She even threatens Gowri to back off. Meanwhile, Gowri's cousin Narahari, an ex-military officer, who has an insatiable lust for her is enraged upon knowing her relation with Raja. With the help of Veera Swamy he murders Shankarayya and manages to put the blame on Saraswati Devi. Chakradhara Rao who witnesses his wife removing the murder weapon from Shankarayya's body while trying to save him misinterprets her intentions and arrest her. An enraged and embarrassed Raja now takes it upon himself to prove his mother's innocence forcing him to have a face off with his own brother, Ramu, once again since he happens to be the public prosecutor. With the help of a CBI officer who was masquerading as a blind man he not only brings the real culprits — Narahari and Veera Swamy to justice but also helps his father in proving that these two knaves are responsible for the illegal manufacture of local bombs. He reunites his family and marries Gowri with his mother's consent.

Cast 
 Krishna as Adv. Raja
 Radha as Gowri
 Sumalatha as Kalyani
 Kaikala Satyanarayana as S. P. Chakradhara Rao
 Jayanthi as Dr. Saraswati Devi
 Tiger Prabhakar as Narahari
 Ranganath as Adv. Ramu
 Gollapudi Maruthi Rao as Shankarayya
 Chalapathi Rao as Veera Swamy
 Deepa as Janaki

Songs 
 "Appa Amma" -
 "Yekku Yekku" -
 "Oyy Labakh" -
 "Oohala Banthi" -
 "Magha Masamochchana" -
 "Aattinum" -

References 

1987 films
Indian action drama films
Telugu remakes of Tamil films
Films scored by K. Chakravarthy
1980s action drama films
1980s Telugu-language films